USRC Virginia was a schooner built in 1797 for the United States Revenue Cutter Service at Portsmouth, Virginia.  At the outset of the Quasi-War in 1798, the only ships available to the Navy were the 10 ships of the Revenue cutter service, the largest of which was the Virginia.  She was transferred to the Navy in 1798 and served in the Quasi War until 1800, when she was returned to the Revenue Cutter Service, recommissioned in 1802 and sold in 1807.

History
The revenue cutter Virginia was a schooner built in 1797 for the United States Revenue Cutter Service at Portsmouth, Virginia.  At the outset of the Quasi-War in 1798, the only ships available to the Navy were the 10 ships of the Revenue Cutter Service, the largest of which was the newly built Virginia.  She was transferred to the United States Navy and commissioned on 25 June, Capt. Francis Bright in command.

She remained on this station until December, when she was assigned identical duty in the West Indies between St. Kitts and Puerto Rico as part of the squadron commanded by Commodore Thomas Truxtun. In addition to cruising with the Navy squadrons, Virginia guarded convoys and relayed messages between fleets.

Despite this success, in June 1799, Virginia was declared unfit for further naval service and returned to the Revenue Cutter Service. She was refitted and commissioned in the Revenue Cutter service in 1802.  She was sold in 1807.

Citations

References

Schooners of the United States Navy
Quasi-War ships of the United States
Ships of the United States Revenue Cutter Service
1797 ships
Ships built in Portsmouth, Virginia